Ibtisam Lutfi (born 1950) is a blind Saudi singer. She was born Khayriyyah Qurban in Ta'if in Saudi Arabia, and is one of the first female singers of that country. She began her career singing at wedding feasts in the city of Jeddah in the 1960s, and over the next two decades became famous in her native country as well as in Egypt. In a phone call with Al Arabiya channel in November 2013, she confirmed that she would be returning to her singing career.

References

1950 births
Living people
20th-century Saudi Arabian women singers
Blind musicians